Shergarh (شیرگڑھ) is a village and union council in Oghi Tehsil, Mansehra District, Khyber Pakhtunkhwa, Pakistan.  It was once the summer capital of the former Tanawal State (also called Amb State and Tanawal).

References 

Soldier Sahibs: Men who made the North West Frontier, Charles Allen, page 139.

External links

 Pakistan Election Commission Pakistan Election Commission - Unique Stats]

Union councils of Mansehra District